The discography of Master P, a U.S. rapper and record producer, also known as entrepreneur P. Miller, consists of fourteen studio albums, 40 singles, 16 compilation albums, one collaboration album, and 33 music videos.

Master P's music has been released on In-A-Minute, SOLAR Records, Priority Records, & Koch Records along with his former record label's No Limit Records, The New No Limit, Guttar Music & his current label No Limit Forever. He also the founder & former CEO of the major independent record label No Limit Records.

In 1991, Master P began his rap career with his first released his first album Get Away Clean on In-A-Minute. His next album Mama's Bad Boy was released in 1992. In 1994 after signing a deal with SOLAR Records he released his next album entitled The Ghettos Tryin to Kill Me!. In 1995 after signing an 85/15 distribution & publishing deal & ownership of all masters with Priority Records for his upcoming label No Limit Records. Master P released his next album 99 Ways to Die it was his first album to chart in Billboard magazine at number forty-one at the Top R&B/Hip-Hop Albums. Master P released his fifth album, Ice Cream Man, in 1996. It contained the lead single "Mr. Ice Cream Man", which had peaked at number ninety on the Billboard Hot 100, his first solo entry there. Ice Cream Man debuted at number twenty-six on the US Billboard 200 chart and was certified platinum by the Recording Industry Association of America (RIAA), making it more successful than his previous effort.

His next album Ghetto D charted the US Billboard 200 at number one, making it Master P's first number one album. The album contained Master P's most successful single to date "Make 'Em Say Uhh!" which went certified platinum. The album itself went certified Three Times platinum. In 1998 his next studio album MP Da Last Don also topped the US Billboard 200 at number one, making it Master P's second number one. It is also Master P's highest selling album to date selling over four-million plus copies making it certified Four Times Platinum in the US. His next studio album Only God Can Judge Me though not as successful as his previous album's it still charted on the Billboard 200 at number two & was certified Gold in the US.

In 2000 his next studio album Ghetto Postage charted on the Billboard 200 at number twenty-six it sold lower than his predecessor albums. After Master P's former label No Limit Records went bankrupt, he created a new label entitled The New No Limit & signed a distribution deal with Universal Records. He released his next studio album entitled Game Face it charted on the Billboard 200 at number fifty-three with substantially lower sales than his previous albums. After dropping himself from Universal Records he signed a new deal with Koch Records now known as E1 Music. He released his next album in 2004 it was entitled Good Side, Bad Side it was released with better overall success charting on the US Billboard 200 at number eleven. His next album Ghetto Bill charted on the US Billboard at number thirty-nine.

On December 6, 2013 Master P released his thirteenth album The Gift via his newly founded label No Limit Forever Records & XLP Distribution. On November 27, 2015 Master P would release his fourteenth album entitled Empire, from the Hood to Hollywood via his label No Limit Forever Records & Globy House Records.

Albums

Studio albums

Extended plays

Soundtrack albums

Collaboration albums

Mixtapes

Compilation albums

Singles

As lead artist

Promotional singles

As featured artist

Collaboration singles

Guest appearances

References

Hip hop discographies
Discographies of American artists